Giottiline is an Italian campervans and motorhome manufacturer.

History
In Colle di Val d'Elsa during 2004 Giottiline company was founded and in 2016 it was bought by a France industrial group named Rapido group, which is owner of twelve brands. In 2022 Giottiline has sales network of over 100 dealers and service points in Europe.

Production
Production offers four lines named ""Siena", "Therry", "Giottivan" and "compact": every line offers various type of variants.

References

External links
 various type

motor vehicle manufacturers of Italy
Companies based in Tuscany
Recreational vehicle manufacturers